The professional head of the army is the Commander of the Army, at present General Shavendra Silva. He is assisted by the Chief of Staff of the Army, currently Major General Senarath Bandara. The Commandant of the Volunteer Force is head of the Army Volunteer Force and is responsible for the administration and recruitment of all reserve units and personal. The Army Headquarters, situated in Colombo is the main administrative and the operational headquarters of the Sri Lanka Army.

Organized and controlled by the Army General Staff at Army HQ, various formations are raised from time to time to suit various security requirements and operation in the country and overseas. The Army at present has deployed one field corps (1 Corps) and five regional commands known as Security Forces Headquarters, which are the Security Forces Headquarters Jaffna (SFHQ-J), Wanni (SFHQ-W), East (SFHQ-E), Mullaitivu (SFHQ-MLT) and South (SFHQ-S).

Each SFHQ and most divisions are commanded by a General Officer Commanding in the rank of Major General. A SFHQ has several divisions under its command and each division is further divided into brigades. Each brigade is commanded by an officer in the rank of Brigadier and has a number of Infantry battalions, support arms (Artillery, Engineers and Signals) and support services (Service Corps, Engineering Services, Ordnance Corps, Electrical and Mechanical Engineers) under assigned to it. There are also several independent brigade (Air Mobile Brigade, Armored Brigade, etc.)

In other parts of the country, there are Area and Sub-Area Headquarters. Armour, Artillery, Engineers and Signals Units are grouped under Brigade Headquarters of their own arm; Armored Brigade, Artillery Brigade and so on.

Following is a list of all combat formations and their commands of the Sri Lanka Army.

Headquarters formations 

Army Headquarters Formation
 Independent Brigade HQ
 Commander Security Unit

SLAVF Headquarters

Field Corps 
1 Corps
Reserve Strike Force
53 Division, based at Inamaluwa, Dambulla
 Air Mobile Brigade
58 Division
Special Operations Force
 Commando Brigade
 Special Forces Brigade

Security Forces Headquarters 
Security Forces Headquarters - Jaffna (SFHQ-J)
 51 Division, based in Kopay
511 Brigade, based in Ottahapulam
512 Brigade, based in Jaffna
513 Brigade, based in Keeramalai
515 Brigade, based in Kankesanthurai
 52 Division, based in the Mirisuvil
521 Brigade, based in Vallei
522 Brigade, based in Vidaththalpalei
523 Brigade, based in Allarai
 55 Division, based in Elephant Pass Military Base, Jaffna Peninsula
551 Brigade
552 Brigade, based in Iyakkachchi
553 Brigade, based in Periyapachchapalai

Security Forces Headquarters - Wanni (SFHQ-W)
 Area Headquarters Mannar, Mannar

21 Division, based in Anuradhapura
211 Brigade, based in Medawachchiya
212 Brigade, based in Anuradhapura
213 Brigade, based in Gajasinghepura

54 Division, based in Mannar
541 Brigade, based in Kalliadi
542 Brigade, based in Manthottam
543 Brigade, based in Pesalei

56 Division, based in Kokeliya
561 Brigade, based in Kanagarayankulam
562 Brigade, based in Echchankulam
563 Brigade, based in Navatkulam

62 Division, based in Galkulama
621 Brigade, based in Welioya
622 Brigade, based in Helamba Wewa
623 Brigade, based in Vedivettukallu

65 Division, based in Alankulam
651 Brigade, based in Mulankavil
652 Brigade, based in Naddankandal
653 Brigade, based in Thachchana Maradamadu

Security Forces Headquarters - East (SFHQ-E)

 22 Division, based in Trincomalee
221 Brigade, based in Plantain Point
222 Brigade, based in Jayanthigama
223 Brigade, based in Kaddaparichchan

 23 Division, based in Poonani, Batticaloa District
231 Brigade, based in Kallady
232 Brigade, based in Tharavikulam
233 Brigade, based in Vakarai

 24 Division
241 Brigade, based in Akkaraipattu
242 Brigade, based in Komari

Security Forces Headquarters – Mullaitivu (SFHQ-MLT)
 57 Division
571 Brigade
572 Brigade
572 Brigade
 59 Division, operating in the Mullaittivu District
591 Brigade, based in Mullaittivu
592 Brigade, based in Mathavalasinghekulam
593 Brigade, based in Nayaru
 64 Division operating in the Mullaittivu District
641 Brigade, based in Puthukkudiyiruppu
642 Brigade, based in Oddusuddan
643 Brigade, based in Muthiyankaddukulam
 66 Division operating in the Kilinochchi District
661 Brigade, based in Poonaryn
662 Brigade, based in Paranthan
663 Brigade, based in Kilinochchi
 68 Division Kombavil, Mullaittivu District
681 Brigade
682 Brigade

Security Forces Headquarters – West (SFHQ-W)
14 Division, based in Colombo, Western Province (formerly Operation Command Colombo)
141 Brigade, based in Gampaha
142 Brigade, based in Colombo and Kalutara
143 Brigade, based in Puttalam and Kurunegala
144 Brigade

61 Division
611 Brigade, responsible for Kegalle and Rathnapura Districts
612 Brigade, responsible for Kaluthara District
613 Brigade, responsible for Galle and Matara Districts

Security Forces Headquarters – Central (SFHQ-C)
 11 Division, based in Kundasale
 111 "Kandy" Brigade, based in Doluwa
112 Brigade, based in Badulla

12 Division, based in Hambanthota
121 Brigade, based in Buttala
122 Brigade, based in Weerawila

Independent units
Divisions 
 Engineering Division
 Field Engineer Brigade
 Plant Engineer Brigade 
 General Engineering Brigade

Brigades
Mechanized Infantry Brigade
Armored Brigade 
Artillery Brigade
Signals Brigade

Disbanded 
Security Forces Headquarters – Kilinochchi 
2 Division
3 Division

References

Sri Lanka Army

Structure of contemporary armies
Army